Devarayanadurga is a temple town and hill station located in the district of Tumakuru in the state of Karnataka in India. The rocky hills are surrounded by forest and the hilltops are dotted with several temples including the Yoganarasimha and the Bhoganarasimha temples and an altitude of 1204 metres.

Devarayanadurga translates to "Devaraya's fort" in Kannada; the town got its current name after the Mysore ruler Chikka Devaraja Wodeyar captured it in one of his victories. The place is thought by many to be haunted.

See also
Namada Chilume

References

Hill stations in Karnataka
Geography of Tumkur district
Hindu temples in Tumkur district
Vishnu temples